The Jamaica national under-17 football team is the national under-17 football team of Jamaica and is controlled by the Jamaica Football Federation. The highest level of competition in which the team may compete is in the FIFA U-17 World Cup, which is held every two years.

Tournament records

FIFA U-17 World Cup record

CONCACAF U-17 Championship Record
1983: Did not enter
1985: Did not enter
1987: Third place Group B
1988: Third place Group B
1991: Second place Group 1
1992: Third place Group B
1994: Third place Group 1
1996: Did not enter
1999: First place Group A
2001: Fourth place Group A
2003: Second place Group A; lost in playoff; Did not qualify
2005: Eliminated in 2nd round
2007: Fifth place Group B
2009: Eliminated in semifinals of the 2008 CFU Youth Cup; Did not qualify
2011: Fourth place
2013: Quarter-finals
2015: Playoff stage
2017: Group stage
2019: Round of 16
2023: Round of 16
From 1983 until 1994, competition was U-16, not U-17

Recent and Upcoming Matches

2016

2017

2018

2019

2023

Current players

2023 squad 

Squad named for the 2023 CONCACAF U-17 Championship to be held in Guatemala from February 11, 2023.

Past players 

Jamoi Topey
Ajeanie Talbott
Nicque Daley
Blake White|
Kaheem Parris
Chad Letts
Jeadine White|
Peter Lee Vassell
Deshane Beckford
Alex Marshall
Dilan Perrin
Javain Brown
Hakim Williams

Honors

Notes and references

U-17
Caribbean national under-17 association football teams